Chambers McKibbin (1841–1918) was a United States Army Brigadier General, whose last tour of duty was as the 1899–1901 commanding officer at Fort Sam Houston in San Antonio, Texas.

Family background
McKibbin was born at Chambersburg, Pennsylvania, November 2, 1841. His three brothers Joseph C. McKibbin, David B. McKibbin and Robert Peebles McKibbin enlisted in the Union Army during the American Civil War.  In 1862, Robert was commissioned as a Lt. Colonel, and David eventually rose to the rank of brigadier general. Joseph would later become a United States Congressman from California.

American Civil War

When the war broke out, Chambers was still a teenager, and not eligible to join the Union Army.  Wanting to contribute to the war effort, he became a sutler, a civilian merchant selling directly to the army. Three months after his participation as a civilian in the  Battle of Gaines' Mill, McKibbin enlisted on September 22, 1862, in the 14th Infantry Regiment, commissioned as a second lieutenant. He fought attached to the Union Army of the Potomac. He was promoted to first lieutenant, June 10, 1864. McGibbon was wounded at both the Battle of Chancellorsville and during his unit's engagement at the Weldon Railroad. He received a citation for bravery for his actions at the May 1864 Battle of North Anna.

Later years

In July 1866, he was commissioned captain in the 35th Infantry. April 1892, he was promoted to  major, 25th Infantry, and promoted to lieutenant colonel of the 21st Infantry in May 1896, participating in the American Indian Wars.

On July 10, 1898, during the Spanish–American War, he was commissioned brigadier general of the U. S. Volunteers, and honorably discharged from the commission at the end of the conflict. After the Spanish surrender, he was appointed military governor of Santiago.

In 1899, he was commissioned as a colonel with the 12th Infantry Regiment, later transferred to the 24th Infantry Regiment. 1899–1901 he was commanding officer at Fort Sam Houston in San Antonio, Texas.
He was transferred to the 24th Infantry, August 12, 1901, and was promoted to brigadier general, October 1902.

Death

McKibbin died December 30, 1918. In retirement, he and his wife Mary had lived at the prestigious Wyoming Apartments, Northwest, Washington, D.C. in the Kalorama neighborhood.  The building is currently on the NRHP NW Quadrant of Washington, D.C. and has also been home to numerous influential persons, including Mamie Eisenhower and Dwight D. Eisenhower. He was buried at Arlington National Cemetery, where his brothers David and Joseph were also buried.

See also

Pershing House

References

1841 births
1918 deaths
People from Chambersburg, Pennsylvania
United States Army generals of World War I